NMIT may refer to:
 North Malabar Institute of Technology, is an engineering college located in Kasaragod, India
 Nitte Meenakshi Institute of Technology, is an engineering college located in Bangalore, India
 Nelson Marlborough Institute of Technology situated in Blenheim, Richmond and Nelson, New Zealand
 Northern Melbourne Institute of TAFE, a technical and further education institute with six campuses in the northern suburbs of Melbourne, Australia